Özgür Çek (born 3 January 1991) is a Turkish professional footballer who plays as a left winger for TFF First League club Gençlerbirliği.

Early years
Özgür Çek began his footballing at a Fenerbahçe school in Istanbul. In 2002, he moved to local club Maltepespor due to its proximity to his residence. He was transferred to Pendikspor in 2004, with club scouts having been impressed with his talent. Özgür Çek was persuaded by the club's training facilities and former players who had gone through the youth system at Pendikspor. His dream was to eventually move to one of Istanbul's "big three" clubs: Beşiktaş, Fenerbahçe and Galatasaray. Özgür Çek later received offers from all three clubs in 2006, choosing Fenerbahçe in the end. In an interview, Özgür Çek remarked that he knew it was very hard for youth players to break through into the first team at Fenerbahçe, but stated that his biggest dream was to play for the club.

Club career

Fenerbahçe signed him to his first professional contract on 1 July 2006. However, he did not make any league appearances for the club, and was later sent to Ankaraspor as part of the deal that brought Özer Hurmacı to Fenerbahçe. His professional debut came against Gaziantepspor on 23 August 2009. Özgür Çek's career with the club didn't last long, as they were expelled from the league because of its relationship with MKE Ankaragücü, ruling that it was contrary to sporting competitiveness" (see 2009–10 in Turkish football).
As a result, Özgür Çek was loaned out to MKE Ankaragücü for the rest of the season. His deal was made permanent at the end of the year, Ankaraspor having ceased operations, signing a five-year deal with MKE Ankaragücü. Özgür Çek has been a regular fixture in the side for the 2010–11 season, starting the first seven matches while scoring two goals.

Eskişehirspor

Özgür Çek signed a 3.5 year contract with Eskişehirspor on 5 January 2013.

Gençlerbirliği

On 12 January 2023, Çek joined Gençlerbirliği on a one-and-a-half-year-deal.

References

External links
 
 Özgür Çek at Footballdatabase
 

1991 births
Living people
People from Erbaa
Turkish footballers
Turkey under-21 international footballers
Turkey youth international footballers
Eskişehirspor footballers
Fenerbahçe S.K. footballers
Ankaraspor footballers
MKE Ankaragücü footballers
Manisa FK footballers
Gençlerbirliği S.K. footballers
Denizlispor footballers
Süper Lig players
Association football wingers
Turkey B international footballers